Jane Morgan (born Florence Catherine Currier; May 3, 1924) is an American former singer of traditional pop. Morgan initially found success in France and the UK before achieving recognition in the US, receiving six gold records. She was a frequent nightclub and Broadway performer, and also appeared numerous times on American television, both as a singer and as a dramatic performer.

Early life
Morgan was born Florence Catherine Currier in Newton, Massachusetts, on 3 May 1924, one of five children born to musicians Olga (Brandenburg) and Bertram Currier. When she was four years old, the Currier family moved to Daytona Beach, Florida. At five she began vocal lessons while continuing piano lessons. During the summers, she took on child roles and appeared in theater productions at the Kennebunkport Playhouse in Kennebunkport, Maine, which her brother had founded. In 1941, she was listed as the Treasurer of the Kennebunkport Playhouse. While attending grade school, Morgan actively engaged in singing and competing against other students throughout Florida and the Southeast. After graduating from Seabreeze High School, she was accepted into New York's Juilliard School of Music. Intending to become an opera singer, she studied opera by day and performed whenever possible.

Early career
Morgan sang popular songs in nightclubs and small restaurants, and at bar mitzvahs and other private parties, to help pay her tuition expenses at Juilliard. Eventually she was hired as a singer at the Roseland Ballroom in Manhattan with the house second band for $25 a week, six nights a week. While she was still at Juilliard (1944), orchestra leader Art Mooney heard her perform and hired her. Mooney changed her name to Jane Morgan by taking the first name of one of his vocalists, Janie Ford, and the last name of another, Marian Morgan.

In 1948, French impresario Bernard Hilda selected her to accompany him to Paris. Hilda was a prominent French society bandleader who needed a young singer to perform at a nightclub that he planned to open near the Eiffel Tower. Morgan began to appear regularly at the Club des Champs-Elysées, performing (two shows per night) American songs to mostly French audiences. Her mother had taught her French and Italian, so she quickly became proficient in French, and performed her act in flawless French, singing the classic songs of Cole Porter, George Gershwin, French songs, and standards of the century. Morgan became a sensation in Paris; accompanied by Hilda and his gypsy violin, she quickly became known throughout France. French café society frequented Hilda's upscale club, which was likened to the Copacabana in New York. Many French songwriters, including Charles Trenet, frequented the club, and they wrote several songs that became hit recordings for Morgan. Morgan and Hilda soon opened a new weekly hour-long television show and she began recording in 1949 on the French Polydor label as well as Parlophone, Philips, and others.

In 1952 Morgan went to Montreal, Quebec, Canada, and opened at the Ritz-Carlton Montreal as a soloist with a bilingual act using French and English. She returned to New York with regular performances in upscale nightclubs and her own radio show on NBC, backed by the 50-piece NBC Symphony Orchestra and also performed at the St. Regis New York. She returned to Europe in 1954 to appear in a London West End review with comedian Vic Oliver, and later at the Savoy Theatre and London Palladium.

American success
Morgan wanted to advance her career in the United States, but booking agents and managers in show business felt she was too specialized and would not make it outside the nightclub circuit. She left her agent and began singing at Lou Walters' Latin Quarter in New York. Walters kept Morgan at the Latin Quarter for a year, when she was noticed by Dave Kapp, who had recently founded a new recording label, Kapp Records. Kapp signed Morgan to a recording contract, and near that same period he signed pianist Roger Williams.

To counter her reputation as a French singer, Kapp had Morgan record "Baseball, Baseball", and her first album release was titled The American Girl from Paris. She recorded several additional albums and soon was paired with Williams, who had gained national acceptance with his recording of "Autumn Leaves". They recorded "Two Different Worlds", which gave Morgan her first significant airplay on US radio. In 1957 Kapp brought The Troubadors, a virtually unknown group of five musicians, to his studio. They had appeared in Love in the Afternoon. Kapp asked Morgan to join The Troubadors and sing "Fascination". Although written in 1904 by F. D. Marchetti as "Valse Tzigane", the song was modified in Paris at the Folies Bergère as a "strip" number. With English lyrics added by Dick Manning in 1932, it had been played throughout the 1957 movie (the French lyric had been created in 1942). Her recording was released in late 1957 and remained on the charts for 29 weeks.

In 1958, Kapp released "The Day the Rains Came" (a French song by Gilbert Becaud called "Le jour où la pluie viendra") with Morgan singing in English on one side and in French on the other. It reached number one in the UK Singles Chart in early 1959. This led to her first television special, Spectacular: the Jane Morgan Hour in early 1959, the same year she married her first husband, Larry Stith. She was featured on the 10 November 1959, jazz special, Timex-All-Star Jazz III.

Middle years
Morgan performed in musicals on the stage and Broadway. She appeared in Can-Can, The King and I, Kiss Me, Kate, Gentlemen Prefer Blondes, Bells Are Ringing, Anniversary Waltz, Affairs of State, Hello, Dolly and others.

She appeared in nightclubs around the U.S., complemented with television appearances and bookings in Las Vegas and Lake Tahoe. In 1958, Morgan was one of six contestants in A Song for Europe to determine the UK's entry to the Eurovision Song Contest 1959. She sang "If Only I Could Live My Life Again", but the song was not selected.

Morgan's agent died in 1959, and her new manager, Jerry Weintraub, was able to obtain bookings for her in many noted US venues. Morgan divorced Larry Stith in 1964, and would later marry Weintraub, more than a decade her junior, in 1965; she and Weintraub later adopted three daughters, Julie, Jamie and Jody. Morgan also has a stepson Michael from Weintraub's first marriage. Morgan and Weintraub separated but never divorced; he died in 2015.

In 1960, she recorded the English-language version of an Italian song, Romantica. The recording was an airplay hit on BBC Radio. She continued recording for Kapp until 1962, her last album being What Now My Love, released later that year.

Later years
Morgan ended her association with Kapp Records after eight years. Weintraub negotiated a deal with Colpix for three albums, including Jane Morgan Serenades the Victors. Morgan's second Colpix LP, The Last Time I Saw Paris, garnered excellent reviews, and a hit single, "C'est Si Bon". After fulfilling her contract with Colpix, Morgan recorded numerous singles and four albums for Epic.

During this period, she had consistent hit singles on the Adult Contemporary charts and continued to appear on top TV programs of the day. Morgan appeared at the Queen Elizabeth Hotel in Canada in 1964; she was also the lead singer, with Bea Lillie and Carol Lawrence, in the Broadway musical production of the Ziegfeld Follies, and succeeded Janis Paige in Mame in 1969. "Being on Broadway was one of the most exciting things in my life because I had always dreamed of it", she said.

In 1966, Morgan recorded the song that she had performed at the Academy Awards, "I Will Wait for You", the English version of a song written for the 1964 film The Umbrellas of Cherbourg by Michel Legrand. From 1967 to 1968, Morgan was under contract at ABC Records, recording half a dozen singles and issuing an LP, which produced several hits. This led to her second TV special, entitled The Jane Morgan Special. Syndicated in March 1968, it included Morgan singing a tribute to Édith Piaf. Morgan's two final albums were for RCA Records: her last LP, Jane Morgan in Nashville, yielded two moderate hits on the country and western charts, including her answer to Johnny Cash's song, "A Boy Named Sue", titled "A Girl Named Johnny Cash" (written by comic Martin Mull). She performed the song on Cash's eponymous television series in early 1971.

Of the experience, Morgan said she was "thrown a bit" by the fact that Nashville normally dispensed with formal arrangements and was known for "head arrangements". The only other time she had recorded without formal arrangements was on her hit single, "Fascination"; nevertheless, she was reportedly dubbed "The Countryest Girl in Nashville" by the crew. She retired from performing in 1973, but has appeared occasionally over the years at special events and benefits. She has in recent years worked as a production assistant to her husband on films including the remake of Ocean's Eleven.

On 10 December 2009, Morgan performed at the UNICEF Ball honoring her husband, Jerry Weintraub, held at the Beverly Wilshire Hotel, singing "Ten Cents a Dance" and "Big Spender". Known as Jane Weintraub, she divides her time between Malibu, California, Palm Springs, California and Kennebunkport, Maine. She has owned Blueberry Hill Farm in Kennebunkport, Maine since 1958.

Morgan's collection of her unique performance gowns spanning from the 1950s to the 1980s were exhibited to the public for the first time, premiering at the Brick Store Museum in Kennebunk, Maine, in February 2022.

Notable associates
Morgan performed for French President Charles de Gaulle, and for five U.S. Presidents: John F. Kennedy, Richard Nixon, Gerald Ford, Jimmy Carter, and George W. Bush. She toured with Jack Benny and John Raitt, and appeared at the Grand Ole Opry. Two of her RCA singles hit the Billboard country charts in 1970.

Television appearances
Morgan made her U.S. television debut on Celebrity Time in 1951. Her early television credits include The Victor Borge Show, The Colgate Comedy Hour, Cavalcade of Stars, The Jack Benny Program, The Jimmy Dean Show, The Jonathan Winters Show and The Hollywood Palace, as well as more than fifty appearances on The Ed Sullivan Show.

Morgan appeared in such television specials as Highways of Melody 1961; Bell Telephone Hour: A Trip to Christmas (1961); Bell Telephone Hour: Christmas Program (1965); Bell Telephone Hour: Masterpieces and Music (1966); Coliseum (1967); Kraft Music Hall: Broadway's Best (1969) and Operation: Entertainment (1969). She starred in three of her own television specials: The Jane Morgan Hour (1959); Voice of Firestone: An Evening in Paris (1959), and The Jane Morgan Show (1968), as well as making several dramatic television appearances, including The Web: Rehearsal for Death (1952); Peter Gunn: Down the Drain (1961); and It Takes a Thief: The Suzie Simone Caper (1970).

Morgan's version of "If Only I Could Live My Life Again" was featured during the closing credits of the second season finale of Apple TV's The Morning Show which was released on Nov. 19, 2021.

On 6 May 2011, Morgan received the 2,439th star on the Hollywood Walk of Fame.

Discography

Singles

Albums (original vinyl)

 This list does not include re-releases.

Albums (CD)

See also
List of artists who reached number one on the UK Singles Chart

References
Notes

Bibliography
 Kaplan, Mike. Variety Who's Who in Show Business, Garland Publishing Inc., 1983, 
 Kapp Records, liner notes, 1957–1962
 Epic Records liner notes, 1965–1967
 RCA Records liner notes, 1969–1970
 Lax, Roger, and Frederick Smith. The Great Song Thesaurus, Oxford University Press, 1989, 
 Maltin, Leonard. Movie and Video Guide 1995, Penguin Books Ltd., 1994 
 McAleer, David. The All Music Book of Hit Singles, Miller Freeman Books, 1994,  
 Murrells, Joseph. Million Selling Records from the 1900s to the 1980s, Arco Publishing Inc., 1984, 
 Osborne, Jerry. Rockin Records, Osborne Publications, 1999, 
 Francis D. McKinley interview with Jane Morgan on 22 May 2000, and subsequent article

External links

Profile @ oldies.com (with wrong year of birth)
UNICEF Ball honoring Jerry Weintraub
Huffington Post: Weintraub Salute

1924 births
Living people
Actresses from Florida
American contraltos
American musical theatre actresses
American women pop singers
American television actresses
Colpix Records artists
Epic Records artists
Kapp Records artists
Musicians from Daytona Beach, Florida
Traditional pop music singers
Seabreeze High School alumni
Singers from Florida
American expatriates in France
American expatriates in Canada